Erez Edelstein (born August 23, 1961) is an Israeli basketball coach.

Coaching career
In 2014, Edelstein was hired as a head coach of the Israel national basketball team.

On June 9, 2016, Edelstein was announced as the new head coach of Maccabi Tel Aviv. On October 22, 2016, he parted ways with the club.

On September 13, 2017, Edelstein parted ways with the Israel national basketball team after a disappointing Eurobasket campaign.

References

1961 births
Living people
Israeli expatriate basketball people in Greece
Hapoel Jerusalem B.C. coaches
Israeli basketball coaches
Israeli expatriates in Greece
Maccabi Tel Aviv B.C. coaches
People from Migdal HaEmek